The Bayer designation Xi Canis Majoris (ξ CMa / ξ Canis Majoris) is shared by two star systems, in the constellation Canis Major:
 ξ¹ Canis Majoris
 ξ² Canis Majoris
They are separated by 0.86° on the sky.

ξ¹ Canis Majoris was member of asterism 軍市 (Jūn Shì), Market for Soldiers, Well mansion. ξ² Canis Majoris was not any member of asterism.

References

Canis Majoris, Xi
Canis Major